Ognjen Mudrinski (born 15 November 1991) is a Serbian professional footballer who plays as a striker for Hungarian club Újpest.

Club career

Vojvodina
Mudrinski began playing football in Vojvodina's youth academy. He scored a goal on his professional debut for the club from Novi Sad at the age of 18 in a match against OFK Beograd on 11 April 2010. However, after being loaned out to various clubs, Mudrinski signed for Jagodina in August 2011. He was quoted saying that "Vojvodina didn't give me a real chance."

Jagodina
Mudrinski made his debut for Jagodina at the age of 19 in a match against OFK Beograd on 20 August 2011. While this time he did not score on his debut, by the end of the 2011–12 season he became the eighth most prolific scorer in the entire league by scoring a total of nine goals. He made his first appearances in UEFA competition at the age of 20 in July 2012 when he played in both legs of his club's elimination by FC Ordabasy in the 2012–13 UEFA Europa League qualifying phase.

Red Star Belgrade
Mudrinski signed for Red Star Belgrade in August 2012. In advance of his promotion to the club, he had chosen the number 91 to represent the team's historic win against Olympique Marseille in the 1991 European Cup Final. On 2 September 2012, he scored a hat-trick against Radnički Niš on his debut for Red Star, becoming the first player in club history to do so. After he played in postponed first fixture match against Javor Ivanjica, Mudrinski collected 16 caps in 15 fixtures in the first half of the season. However, by the end of the 2012–13 season, Red Star coach Ricardo Sá Pinto told Mudrinski that he would not be relying on him in the following season.

Greuther Fürth and Aarau
On 8 July 2013, Mudrinski signed a three-year contract with SpVgg Greuther Fürth for an alleged €800,000. Playing for the club, Mudrinski collected 14 caps in the 2013–14 season in 2. Bundesliga, also making an appearance in DFB-Pokal and one in the play-off. After he made just one appearance, scoring a goal in DFB-Pokal match against SV Waldkirch at the beginning of the 2014–15 season, Mudrinski moved to Switzerland. On 28 August 2014, Mudrinski signed a one-year contract with FC Aarau.

Spartak Subotica
In January 2016, Mudrinski signed a two-year contract with Spartak Subotica. For the spring half of the 2015–16 Serbian SuperLiga season, Mudrinski played 13 league matches, mostly as a back-up option, and scored 2 goals. He also played two cup rounds, scoring two goals in a match against his former club Jagodina. Mudrinski started the 2016–17 season as the first choice striker. After the first half-season, he promoted himself as the best team scorer with nine goals at total. In April 2017, Mudrinski extended his contract with the club for another year.

Čukarički
On 25 July 2017, Mudrinski signed a three-year contract with Čukarički, with his transfer from Spartak Subotica costing €200,000. He made his debut for Čukarički in a 2–0 victory over Napredak Kruševac on 29 July 2017. On 25 August 2017, he scored his first goal in a league match with FK Rad, which Čukarički won 1–0 away. On 1 October 2017, Mudrinski was injured during a match against Partizan after a tackle by Everton Luiz. Mudrinski returned to the field in a friendly match against Bečej on 24 January 2018. On 18 March 2018, Mudrinski was sent-off in a 3–3 draw against Javor Ivanjica, three minutes after scoring a goal. Shortly before, he had replaced Marko Docić.

International career
Mudrinski has played for the Serbia national under-21 football team. On 25 October 2012, the Football Association of Serbia suspended Mudrinski and Nikola Ninković from playing in all national teams for one year due to incidents at the under-21 international against England in Kruševac on 16 October.

Career statistics

Club

Honours

Club
Maribor
Slovenian PrvaLiga: 2021–22

Individual
Serbian SuperLiga Team of the Season: 2018–19
Slovenian PrvaLiga Player of the Year: 2021–22
Slovenian PrvaLiga top scorer: 2021–22
Maribor Player of the Year: 2021

References

External links
 Ognjen Mudrinski stats at 90minut.pl 
 Ognjen Mudrinski stats at utakmica.rs 
 
 
 

1991 births
Living people
People from Srbobran
Serbian footballers
Serbia under-21 international footballers
Serbian expatriate footballers
Association football forwards
FK Vojvodina players
FK Hajduk Kula players
RFK Novi Sad 1921 players
FK Jagodina players
Red Star Belgrade footballers
SpVgg Greuther Fürth players
FC Aarau players
FK Spartak Subotica players
FK Čukarički players
Jagiellonia Białystok players
HNK Gorica players
NK Maribor players
Újpest FC players
Serbian SuperLiga players
Serbian First League players
2. Bundesliga players
Swiss Super League players
Ekstraklasa players
Croatian Football League players
III liga players
Slovenian PrvaLiga players
Ognjen Mudrinski
Nemzeti Bajnokság I players
Serbian expatriate sportspeople in Germany
Serbian expatriate sportspeople in Switzerland
Serbian expatriate sportspeople in Poland
Serbian expatriate sportspeople in Croatia
Serbian expatriate sportspeople in Slovenia
Serbian expatriate sportspeople in Thailand
Serbian expatriate sportspeople in Hungary
Expatriate footballers in Germany
Expatriate footballers in Switzerland
Expatriate footballers in Poland
Expatriate footballers in Croatia
Expatriate footballers in Slovenia
Expatriate footballers in Thailand
Expatriate footballers in Hungary